London Voodoo is a 2004 British horror film written, produced, and directed by Robert Pratten; and starring Doug Cockle, and Sara Stewart. The film centers on an analyst who has relocated his family, only for his wife to become possessed by a dark spirit that wishes the family harm.

Plot

When ambitious analyst Lincoln Mathers (played by Doug Cockle) relocates his family from New York to London, his wife Sarah (Sara Stewart) discovers a new disturbing power and becomes hostage to an ancient spirit. As Mathers notices that the family is tearing apart and that his wife's behavior becomes more violent and erratic, he accepts that to save the woman he married he must take a leap of faith.

Cast
 Doug Cockle as Lincoln Mathers
 Sara Stewart as Sarah Mathers
 Grace Sprott as Beth Mathers
 Vonda Barnes as Kelly
 Trisha Mortimer as Fiona
 Sven-Bertil Taube as Lars
 Michael Nyqvist as Magnus
 Jacqueline Boatswain as Ruth
 Tony Freeman as McAlistair

Release

Home media
London Voodoo was released on DVD by Heretic Films on 31 May 2005. It was later released by Nucleus Films on 30 October 2006.

Reception

London Voodoo received mostly negative reviews upon its release.
Dennis Harvey from Variety gave the film a mixed review, writing, "Maintaining a straight face even as the action takes a turn toward the ludicrous, English horror entry London Voodoo should please genre fans, though it lacks the originality or name thesps that might’ve merited theatrical pickup."

References

External links

2004 films
2004 horror films
British supernatural horror films
Films about Voodoo
Films about spirit possession
Films set in London
Films shot in London
Religious horror films
2000s English-language films
2000s British films